George Francis (born 12 September 1998 in Australia) is an Australian rugby union player who plays for the  in Super Rugby. His playing position is prop. He was named in the Waratahs squad for Round 5 of the 2021 Super Rugby AU season.

Reference list

External links
itsrugby.co.uk profile

Australian rugby union players
1998 births
Living people
Rugby union props
Canberra Vikings players
Queensland Country (NRC team) players
New South Wales Waratahs players